The 14317/14318 Indore–Dehradun Express is a bi-weekly train service, which runs between Indore, the largest city and commercial capital of Madhya Pradesh and Dehradun, the capital city of Uttarakhand in India.

Coach composition

The train consists of 13 coaches:

 1 AC II Tier
 1 AC III Tier
 5 Sleeper class
 4 General Unreserved
 2 Seating cum Luggage Rake

Service

14317/ Indore–Dehradun Express has an average speed of 41 km/hr and covers 1180 km in 28 hrs 40 mins.
14318/ Dehradun–Indore Express has an average speed of 47 km/hr and covers 1180 km in 25 hrs 00 mins.

Route and halts

The important halts of the train are:

 
 
 
 
 
 
 
 
 
 
 
 
 
 
 
 
 Deoband

Schedule

Rake sharing

The train shares its rake with 14309/14310 Ujjaini Express.

Direction reversal

Train reverses its direction 2 times at:

Traction

Both trains are hauled by a Diesel Loco Shed, Tughlakabad-based WDM-3A or WDP-4D or WDP-4B diesel locomotive.

See also

 Ujjaini Express

References

Transport in Indore
Trains from Dehradun
Express trains in India
Rail transport in Madhya Pradesh
Rail transport in Uttar Pradesh
Rail transport in Rajasthan
Rail transport in Haryana
Rail transport in Delhi